Andy Kolle alias Kaos (born April 27, 1982) is an American professional boxer.

Professional career
Kolle made his professional debut with a third-round knockout win against Nick Whiting on March 6, 2004. In his professional career to date Kolle has notched wins against Matt Vanda (twice), Jonathan Reid, and Anthony Bonsante, while losing to Andre Ward, Paul Williams, Caleb Truax and Cerresso Fort.

Notes

External links

 Horton's Gym: 

1982 births
Living people
Boxers from Minnesota
People from Fergus Falls, Minnesota
American male boxers
Middleweight boxers